Arturo Frias (born October 27, 1955) is an American former professional boxer who competed from 1975 to 1985. He held the WBA lightweight title from 1981 to 1982.

Boxing career
Frias began his professional boxing career on February 7, 1975, one month and a half after he had turned eighteen years old. He beat Alfredo Medrano by a six round decision in San Diego that night. He made his Los Angeles debut defeating Victor de La Cruz on March 17 of that year. On his third fight, Frias obtained a six round technical decision win over Eddie Murray, who quadrupled Frias' experience, having held eight fights before their bout, compared to Frias' two fights. Murray was undefeated before losing to Frias.

On Frias' eighth bout, he won once again by a technical decision, defeating Basilio Onate in two rounds, on September 2, 1976, also in Los Angeles. Frias' first knockout victory came on his tenth fight, when he defeated Canelo Salinas in the second round on December 16 of that year.

On February 26, 1981, Frias entered the WBA's top ten rankings at the Lightweight division, with a ten round decision win over Jaime Nava, in Los Angeles. On May 30, he held his first fight abroad, and suffered his first professional defeat, at the hands of former world champion Ernesto España, who outpointed Frias over ten rounds in Caracas, Venezuela.

Despite suffering his first professional defeat, Frias was not dropped from the WBA's rankings at the Lightweight division, and, after two more wins, he received his first world title try, against WBA lightweight champion Claude Noel, on December 5 of 1981, in Las Vegas.

Frias, who was not generally known as a heavy hitter, became world champion when he knocked Noel out in the eighth round. On his first defense, held on January 30, 1982, in Los Angeles, he avenged his defeat to former world champion España, beating the Venezuelan by a nine round technical decision.

Frias then signed to defend his crown against Ray Mancini. An unclarified incident happened weeks before the fight, when some armed men came looking for Mancini at his hotel room as he trained for his challenge of Frias in the city of Tucson, Arizona. Frias himself was never signaled as a suspect in the incident, and Mancini-Frias took place on May 8, 1982, in Las Vegas. In what was often called the best first round in boxing history (until Marvin Hagler beat Thomas Hearns three years later), Frias wobbled Mancini and bloodied the challenger's nose in the fight's opening minute, only to have Mancini drop him and win the fight by knockout in the last minute of the first round.

On July 18 of that year, Frias bid for the USBA Lightweight title, losing by a fifth round knockout to Ruben Muñoz Jr., in Atlantic City, New Jersey.

Frias obtained four more victories before facing former world title challenger Kelvin Lampkins, on December 13, 1984, in Bakersfield. He lost by a ninth round knockout to Lampkins.

His next fight was also highly anticipated, as he faced former two division world champion and fellow Chicano Bobby Chacon, on August 15, 1985, in Sacramento. Despite dropping Chacon in the first round, Frias lost by a seventh round knockout.

Arturo Frias retired after that bout, with a record of 28 wins and 5 losses in 33 bouts, with 8 wins by knockout. He currently resides in Whittier, CA.

External links
 

1956 births
Living people
Boxers from California
American boxers of Mexican descent
World boxing champions
American male boxers
Lightweight boxers